

Barna is a locality in the Australian state of South Australia located on the Eyre Peninsula about  north-west of the state capital of Adelaide and about  east of the municipal seat in Kimba.

Barna's boundaries were created on 6 May 1999 for the “local established name” which is derived from the cadastral unit of the Hundred of Barna. The boundaries of both the locality and the hundred align with exception to some land on the locality's southern boundary. The Middleback Road, an unsealed road, passes through the locality from the Lincoln Highway in the east to Kimba in the west. Land use within the locality is ’primary production’.

The 2016 Australian census which was conducted in August 2016 reports that Barna had no people living within its boundaries.

Barna is located within the federal division of Grey, the state electoral district of Giles and the local government area of the District Council of Kimba.

References

Towns in South Australia
Eyre Peninsula